Murrin Provincial Park is a provincial park in British Columbia, Canada, located just south of Squamish beside the Sea-to-Sky Highway.  The park is approximately 24 ha. in size and has a popular highway-side picnic ground and small swimming lake (Browning Lake), but it is most notable for a collection of petroglyphs located away from the highway and accessed by trail.  Several rockfaces in the area of the park are popular with the local mountain-climbing community, though the site is nowhere as busy as the nearby Stawamus Chief.

Other provincial parks nearby are Stawamus Chief Provincial Park, Shannon Falls Provincial Park and Porteau Cove Provincial Park.

References

External links
 Murrin Park Loop Hiking Trail

Provincial parks of British Columbia
Squamish people
Sea-to-Sky Corridor
1962 establishments in British Columbia
Protected areas established in 1962